Najvada George (born 21 February 1999) is an Australian rugby league footballer and former basketball player who plays for the Wests Tigers in the NSWRL Women's Premiership. 

Background
Born in Melbourne, George was a basketball player before making the switch to rugby league. In the 2015–16 season, she played for the Dandenong Rangers in the WNBL and represented the Australian Sapphires under-17 side.

Playing career
In 2017, George began playing rugby league for the Werribee Bears. In June 2018, she represented the Combined Affiliated States at the Women's National Championships. On 6 October 2018, she represented the Prime Minister's XIII in their 40–4 win over Papua New Guinea.

In 2019, George moved to Sydney and joined the Wests Tigers NSWRL Women's Premiership side. At the end of the season, she won the club's Player of the Year award.

In May 2019, she represented NSW City at the Women's National Championships. In July 2019, she joined the St George Illawarra Dragons NRL Women's Premiership team.

In Round 2 of the 2019 NRL Women's season, she made her debut in the Dragons' 26–6 win over the New Zealand Warriors. On 6 October 2019, she came off the bench in the Dragons' 6–30 Grand Final loss to the Brisbane Broncos.

In March 2020, she was ruled out for the season after tearing her anterior cruciate ligament (ACL).

References

External links
NRL profile

1999 births
Living people
Australian female rugby league players
Rugby league props
St. George Illawarra Dragons (NRLW) players
Wests Tigers NSWRL Women's Premiership players
Australian women's basketball players
Dandenong Rangers players
Sportswomen from Victoria (Australia)